Cowslip is a common name for several plants and may refer to:

 Primula veris, a flowering plant commonly known as cowslip 
 Primula deorum, a flowering plant known as God's cowslip and rila cowslip 
 Primula florindae, a flowering plant known as giant cowslip and Tibetan cowslip 
 Primula sikkimensis, a flowering plant known as Himalayan cowslip and Sikkim cowslip 
 Caltha palustris, a flowering plant known as marsh marigold and sometimes as cowslip 
 Pulmonaria angustifolia, blue cowslip or narrow-leaved lungwort